Gonzalo Daniel Abán (born 11 June 1987) is an Argentine football striker who plays for Chilean Segunda División side San Antonio Unido.

Club career 
Abán came through the youth system of River Plate but, shortly after making his first team debut, he was transferred on a long-term loan to Argentinos Juniors.

International career 
Abán played for the Argentina Under-20 team at the 2007 South American Youth Championship in Paraguay, where he scored one goal.

Honours
San Luis
 Primera B (1): 2013 Apertura

Unión La Calera
 Primera B (1): 2017 Transición

External links
  
 
 

1987 births
Living people
People from Catamarca Province
Argentine footballers
Argentina under-20 international footballers
Association football forwards
Club Atlético River Plate footballers
Argentinos Juniors footballers
Ferro Carril Oeste footballers
Racing de Olavarría footballers
San Luis de Quillota footballers
Unión Española footballers
Unión La Calera footballers
Cobreloa footballers
Deportes Limache footballers
San Antonio Unido footballers
Argentine Primera División players
Primera Nacional players
Torneo Federal A players
Primera B de Chile players
Chilean Primera División players
Segunda División Profesional de Chile players
Expatriate footballers in Chile
Argentine expatriate sportspeople in Chile
Argentine expatriates in Chile